Hippolytia is a genus of flowering plants in the daisy family native to temperate Asia.

 Species
 Hippolytia alashanensis (Ling) C.Shih - Gansu, Inner Mongolia
 Hippolytia crassicollum (Rech.f.) K.Bremer & Humphries - Afghanistan
 Hippolytia delavayi (Franch. ex W.W.Sm.) C.Shih - Sichuan, Yunnan
 Hippolytia desmantha C.Shih - Qinghai 
 Hippolytia dolichophylla (Kitam.) K.Bremer & Humphries - Sichuan
 Hippolytia glomerata C.Shih - Tibet 
 Hippolytia gossypina (C.B.Clarke) C.Shih Tibet, Nepal, Sikkim
 Hippolytia herderi (Regel & Schmalh.) Poljakov - Altay, Kazakhstan, Kyrgyzstan, Uzbekistan, Tajikistan, Xinjiang
 Hippolytia kennedyi (Dunn) Ling - Tibet
 Hippolytia megacephala (Rupr.) Poljakov - Kazakhstan, Kyrgyzstan, Uzbekistan
 Hippolytia schugnanica (C.Winkl.) Poljakov - Kazakhstan, Kyrgyzstan, Uzbekistan, Afghanistan, Iran
 Hippolytia senecionis (Jacquem. ex Besser) Poljakov ex Tzvelev  - Afghanistan, Kashmir, Tibet
 Hippolytia syncalathiformis C.Shih - Tibet
 Hippolytia tomentosa (DC.) Tzvelev - Kashmir, Tibet
 Hippolytia trifida (Turcz.) Poljakov - Mongolia, Inner Mongolia
 Hippolytia yunnanensis (Jeffrey) C.Shih - Yunnan, Myanmar

References

Anthemideae
Asteraceae genera